Group action may refer to:

 Group action (mathematics)
 Group action (sociology)

See also
Action group (disambiguation)
Class action, a type of lawsuit
Collective action, action taken by a group to achieve a common objective